Mirzapur-Bankipur in Hooghly district in the Indian state of West Bengal.

References 

Railway stations in Hooghly district
Howrah railway division
Kolkata Suburban Railway stations
Railway stations opened in 1917